Happily Ever After is an Indian Hindi-language web series created by The Zoom Studios. Written and directed by Navjot Gulati, it stars Naveen Kasturia and Harshita Gaur with Shivankit Singh Parihar, Gurpreet Saini and Shruti Das. It traces the story of a couple, Roneet and Avni who struggle to achieve their dream of having a perfect wedding because of a limited budget.

Happily Ever After directed by Navjot Gulati, premiered simultaneously in the company's media streaming platform The Zoom Studio and in YouTube, on 1 February 2020 and it received positive response from audience.

Cast

Production
Naveen Kasturia was cast as Roneet Bagchi. While, Harshita Gaur was cast as Avani Mehndiratta. A major portion of the series was shot at the hotels and palaces in Kumbalgarh. The show has managed to get the largest ensemble cast of 54 characters under one roof.

Release
Happily Ever After was released on 1 February 2020 on Zoom Studio's official Youtube page. It is also digitally available on ZEE5 and MX Player.

Episodes

References

External links
 

Hindi-language web series
2020 web series debuts